Ischyja is a genus of moths of the family Noctuidae erected by Jacob Hübner in 1823.

Description
Palpi with second joint broad and rectangularly scaled, reaching vertex of head. Third joint long, naked and oblique. Antennae thickened and fasciculate in male. Thorax and abdomen smoothly scaled. Tibia spineless. Fore tibia with a triangular tuft of hair. Mid-tibia slightly fringed. Hind tibia clothed with long hair. Forewings with highly arched costa towards the apex, which is produced and acute. Outer margin obliquely curved. Hindwings with very short cell. Male with veins 2 to 4 running close together to near outer margin. Larva with four pairs of abdominal prolegs.

Species
 Ischyja albata Felder & Rogenhofer, 1874
 Ischyja anna Swinhoe, 1902
 Ischyja ebusa Swinhoe, 1902
 Ischyja ferrifracta Snellen, 1863
 Ischyja gynnis Prout, 1928
 Ischyja hagenii Snellen, 1885
 Ischyja hemiphaea Hampson, 1926
 Ischyja inferna Swinhoe, 1902
 Ischyja manlia Cramer, 1776
 Ischyja manlioides Prout, 1928
 Ischyja marapok 
 Ischyja neocherina Butler, 1877
 Ischyja paraplesius Rothschild, 1920
 Ischyja subreducta

References

 
 

Catocalinae